"Hush Hush; Hush Hush" is the remix of "Hush Hush", a song by American female group The Pussycat Dolls. The track was written by Andreas Romdhane, Josef Larossi, Ina Wroldsen, Nicole Scherzinger, Dino Fekaris, and Freddie Perren and produced by the former two alongside Ron Fair and Dave Audé is included on the reissues of the group's second album Doll Domination (2008). It was released on May 12, 2009 by Interscope Records as the album's seventh overall and final single. It is also the group's final release before their disbandment in 2010 until they reformed in 2019. Originally a ballad on the album, the song was remixed for its release as a single with a more uptempo disco-influenced production and interpolation of Gloria Gaynor's "I Will Survive" (1978) with lyrics alluding to a doomed relationship.

As with "Jai Ho! (You Are My Destiny)", Scherzinger—the group's lead singer—was originally to be credited as a featured artist on the song, causing further dissatisfaction within the group. Following a public outburst by Melody Thornton during The Circus Starring Britney Spears, "Hush Hush; Hush Hush" was released without the inclusion of Scherzinger's credit although she does still appear in Billboard chart listings. The song was a moderate commercial success, managing to peak top-ten in Australia, Belgium (Wallonia), Finland and France. In the United States, it charted at 73 on the Billboard Hot 100, and topped the Hot Dance Club Songs chart. An accompanying music video for the song, directed by Ray Kay, premiered on May 27, 2009. The video was met with mixed reviews, with music critics noting the over-emphasis on Scherzinger but also calling it the most revealing Pussycat Dolls video yet.

Background and release 
Doll Domination, the Pussycat Dolls second studio album, was released in September 2008 and features a song entitled "Hush Hush" which was written by Andreas Romdhane, Josef Larossi, Ina Wroldsen and Nicole Scherzinger while the production was handled by the former two as the duo Quiz & Larossi and Ron Fair. The track was recorded by Mike "Angry" Eleopoulos and Tal Herzberg with the assistance of Greg DePante, Steve Genewick, and Keith Gretlein and mixed by Dave Pensado, Jaycen Joshua, and Andrew Wuepper at Quiz & Larossi Studios in Stockholm, Sweden, The Boiler Room in Santa Monica, California, as well as the Henson Studios in Los Angeles. Fair arranged and conducted the strings, which were recorded by Frank Wolf. Other instrumentation and programming was carried out by Quiz & Larossi. Idolator's Mike Nied described "Hush Hush" as an "empowering ballad" that rests on a "sparse production," where Scherzinger laments over a dead relationship. Spence D. of IGN, described the song as having a "down tempo forlornness."

In March 2009, it was announced that Doll Domination would be reissued in different editions to include new songs including an up-tempo remix of "Hush Hush" titled "Hush Hush; Hush Hush". The remixed version was first performed by Scherzinger at their second concert tour, Doll Domination Tour (2009), during the section where each member performed solo. Freddie Perren and Dino Fekaris received co-writing credits for the song, for containing interpolations of Gloria Gaynor's "I Will Survive" (1978) and includes quotation of the original string arrangement by David Blumberg. "Hush Hush; Hush Hush" was produced by Fair, Dave Audé and Quiz & Larossi while Scherzinger handled vocal production and arrangement with Fair. The remix was described as a "dated faux-disco mess" by Nick Levine of Digital Spy.

The single was scheduled to be released on April 28 with the pre-order's cover art having Scherzinger's name credited as a featured artist, just like their previous single, "Jai Ho! (You Are My Destiny)". It led to dissatisfaction with other members and media reports speculated that Scherzinger's exit from the group was imminent. While opening for The Circus Starring Britney Spears (2009) in Glendale, Arizona, Melody Thornton addressed the crowd during their break saying, "[...] let me give a shout-out to my family. Thank you for supporting me, even if I'm not featured" referring to the billing of the singles, and encouraging the audience to follow their dreams and to "never let anyone stomp on them, ever." Scherzinger later referred about her billing as a featured artist during a radio interview. "It's no big deal, that doesn't take away from anybody else in the group. That's my role. I wrote 'Hush Hush' as well." Following the controversy, Hush Hush; Hush Hush was ultimately released as a digital download on May 12, 2009 without Scherzinger's billing as a featured artist.

Reception

Critical 
Taila Craines of Orange positively reviewed the song's original version. "['Hush Hush'] is an epic ballad promoting the Dolls as strong women who 'never asked for help' from their men."
 Steve Jones of USA Today recommended to do download the song. The remix was negatively criticized. Digital Spy's Robert Copsey gave a review of two stars out of five for lacking "the feisty R&B edge that made the likes of 'Don't Cha' and 'When I Grow Up' so effective". 'Idolator' wrote that " ['Hush Hush; Hush Hush'] is an unspectacular dance-pop track with Scherzinger’s muscular gasps leading the way, rhyming straw-ng and law-ng. But a simple girl-power post-breakup anthem would not help the Dolls reclaim their strategic position in the Pop Wars." However Orange liked the song commenting that the remixed version is "very fun indeed." "Hush Hush; Hush Hush" was ranked at number eighty-one in the highest listener-rated 2009 pop singles on AOL Radio.

Chart performance 
In the United States, "Hush Hush; Hush Hush" debuted at number 96 on the Billboard Hot 100 issue dated March 30, 2009. On the Hot Dance/Club Songs chart "Hush Hush; Hush Hush" fared better; it earned them their sixth consecutive number one.

Music video
The music video for the "Hush Hush; Hush Hush" was directed by Rich Lee. The video makes use of product placement of Campari, Nokia 5800 XpressMusic and HP Mini 1000 Vivienne Tam Edition. The video premiered on May 26, 2009.

Synopsis 

The music video begins with Nicole Scherzinger lounging in a bathtub, similar to a scene of Cindy Crawford in George Michael's video for "Freedom! '90" (1990). As the ballad transits unto the remix she passes a door onto a surreal hall of staircases going in different directions. When the second verse begins, Scherzinger is seen wearing a gold sequinned halterneck dress while the rest of the members are seen skating in a roller disco. In the next scene in the attic while Ashley Roberts and Kimberly Wyatt are hanging from the chandeliers as Scherzinger enters the room. As the second chorus begins, Scherzinger wears a tight-fitting silver basque.

She enters into the basement, which it turned into a nightclub the Dolls for their signature dance sequence in the middle of the video. In the scene Perez Hilton makes a cameo appearance as a DJ, while Carmen Electra dances beside him. The video then fades, and opens on a close shot of Scherzinger's face in front of a disco mirror ball wearing an afro wig, which paid homage to Diana Ross. After, the Pussycat Dolls are dancing with male partners in the room with the mirror ball. At the end, Nicole Scherzinger is finishing the song singing "Baby, Hush Hush". It closes with a large shot which reveals the video to have taken place in a dollhouse with all dancers and Dolls in the lowest disco room.

Reception 
Nick Levine of Digital Spy described the video as "barmy". Celebuzz praised the video describing it as a "steamy clip". "It starts out in the best possible way: With lead Doll Nicole Scherzinger wet and naked." Mirror.co.uk commented "It's a wonder Formula 1 ace Lewis, then aged 24 at the time, could keep his mind on the ball as he played golf yesterday", referring on Scherzinger who is naked on the video. Reviewer Melinda Newman commended the overemphasis of lead singer Nicole Scherzinger. "It's a PCD' video in name only given that the other dancers barely have more than cameo appearances. There's not even the remotest hint that there are other people in the group until more than a minute in when she passes through a door onto a multi-level staircase and the other Dolls are dancing as the song morphs from a ballad to dance number. The other Pussycat Dolls are completely relegated to background dancers, along with the other hired hands."

Formats and track listings

French CD single
"Hush Hush; Hush Hush" – 4:12
"Hush Hush; Hush Hush" (the Bimbo Jones radio remix) – 4:00
"Hush Hush" (original version) – 3:48

European download single
"Hush Hush; Hush Hush" – 4:12
"Hush Hush; Hush Hush" (video) – 4:19

Credits and personnel 
Credits adapted from the liner notes of Doll Domination.

Recording
Recorded at Quiz & Larossi Studios (Stockholm, Sweden), The Boiler Room (Santa Monica, California), and the Henson Studios in (Los Angeles, California).

Sample
Contains a sample of "I Will Survive", performed by Gloria Gaynor, as written by Freddie Perren and Dino Fekaris and an interpolation of the original string arrangement by David Blumberg.

Personnel

The Pussycat Dolls – primary artist
Greg DePante – assistant engineer 
Eric Eyland – assistant engineer 
Dave Audé – production, programming 
Bruce Dukov – concertmaster 
Greg DePante – assistant engineer
Mike "Angry" Eleopoulos – recording 
Ron Fair – production, vocal production, vocal arrangement, strings arrangement and conduct, keyboards
Steve Genewick – assistant engineer 
Keith Gretlein – assistant engineer
Tal Herzberg – Pro Tools, recording
Jaycen Joshua – mixing 
Josef Larossi – songwriting, production, recording
Gayle Levant – harp 
Peter Mokran – mixing 
Johnathan Merritt – assistant engineer
Danny Ponce – recording 
Dave Pensado – mixing 
Andreas Romdhane – songwriting, production, instruments, programming, recording
Nicole Scherzinger – songwriting, vocal production, vocal arrangement
Ryan Shanahan – assistant engineer 
Tommy Vicari – strings recording 
Eric Weaver – assistant engineer 
Frank Wolf – strings recording 
Ina Wroldsen – songwriter
Andrew Wuepper – assistant engineer

Charts

Weekly charts

Monthly charts

Year-end charts

Certifications

Release history

See also 
List of number-one dance singles of 2009 (U.S.)
List of number-one singles of the 2010s (Hungary)

References

2000s ballads
2009 songs
2009 singles
The Pussycat Dolls songs
Interscope Records singles
Songs written by Andreas Romdhane
Songs written by Josef Larossi
Songs written by Ina Wroldsen
Songs written by Nicole Scherzinger
Song recordings produced by Nicole Scherzinger
Pop ballads
Song recordings produced by Quiz & Larossi
Songs written by Freddie Perren
Songs written by Dino Fekaris
Number-one singles in the Commonwealth of Independent States
Number-one singles in Hungary
Music videos directed by Rich Lee